The 1904 University of Florida Blue and White football team represented the University of Florida in Lake City in the sport of American football during the 1904 college football season. This was neither the modern University of Florida nor the modern Florida Gators, but a team fielded by one of its four predecessor institutions that had been known as Florida Agricultural College until 1903. They were led by player-coach Marvin O. Bridges, whose brothers also played on the squad.

In an attempt to grow the previously semi-organized football program and make it more competitive with established programs across the south, the Blue and White scheduled the most challenging slate of opponents of any Florida school up to that time. The squad struggled as a result, going winless and failing to score a single point in five games.

The difficult 1904 season would be the final campaign for the program, as the University of Florida in Lake City ceased to exist after the 1904-1905 school term. The Florida legislature consolidated the school with three other state-supported institutions per the Buckman Act of 1905 to establish the modern University of Florida in Gainesville. When the new university first fielded a football team in 1906, no players or coaches from the 1904 Blue and White were associated with the program.

Before the season 
Various public and private colleges in Florida had organized football teams before 1904, but the programs were informal, and schedules usually consisted of a few games played against in-state colleges and local athletic clubs in venues that were little more than open fields. The University of Florida at Lake City sought to jump-start its football program by playing the most ambitious schedule of any Florida school to date. The "Blue and White" had never faced off against an out of state opponent, but they assembled a 1904 slate which featured road games against several established southern football programs, including Mike Donahue's first Auburn squad and John Heisman's first team at Georgia Tech.

1904 Schedule
The entire schedule was played in October. To reduce travel costs, the team played four road games during a two and a half week train trek through Alabama and Georgia. They returned to Lake City in mid-October and concluded the season with their lone home game, a match-up with in-state rival Florida State College on October 21. The slate proved too ambitious for the fledgling program, as the squad went winless and did not score a single point over the entire season.

Game summaries

Alabama
The season opened with a 29–0 loss to Alabama. Touchdowns were scored by William LaFayette Ward (2), Chamberlain, Auxford Burks and Frank Clark.

The starting lineup was: Weller (left end), Buck (left tackle), T. Cason (left guard), Keene (center), Bratton (right guard), T. McGuire (right tackle), B. H. Bridges (right end), McDonnell (quarterback), R. Cason (left halfback), B. T. Bridges (right halfback), C. McGuire (fullback).

Auburn
The October 4, 1904 game against the University of Florida was considered a practice game by Auburn and is not included in the Tiger's official record of 5–0 for the season.

Florida-Georgia dispute
The Florida team next traveled to Macon, Georgia to face the Georgia Bulldogs and lost 52-0. The University of Georgia still counts this game as a win against the Florida Gators even though the modern University of Florida did not yet exist, adding another layer of intrigue to the Florida–Georgia football rivalry. UGA sports historian Dan Magill sums up Georgia's attitude: "That's where Florida was back then. We can't help it if they got run out of Lake City."

Georgia Tech

Source:

Only a single first down was scored on Tech, a 77–0 loss. The starting lineup was: Zealius (left end), Bratton (left tackle), T. McGuire (left guard), Keene (center), O'Berry (right guard), Rowlett (right tackle), R. Woller (right end), R. Cason (quarterback), Clarke (left halfback), Bridges (right halfback), C. McGuire (fullback)

Florida State College
The Blue and White had reason for optimism coming into their last game of the season against the Florida State College Eleven (FSC). They were finally playing a home game, they had beaten FSC in Lake City in 1902, and FSC had been beaten soundly by Georgia Tech in the only game they'd played of their 1904 slate. This was not first meeting between FSC's player-coach Jack Forsythe and Marvin Bridges, his counterpart for the Blue and White; Forsythe was a player on the Clemson Tigers team that tied Bridges' Cumberland Bulldogs in a 1903 battle which was dubbed the SIAA championship game.

Their 1904 match-up was not nearly as close; the Blue and White were shut out again and lost 23-0. As a newspaper account reported, "The people of Lake City had expected at least one victory after a long series of defeats encountered by the university and were greatly disappointed. The university should be made stronger before it attempts to play again." FSC would go on to beat Stetson and lay claim to a "state championship".

1905 season

1905 was a year of transition. The Florida legislature had completely reorganized the state's system of higher education with the passage of the Buckman Act. The University of Florida in Lake City was consolidated with three other state colleges (including Florida State College) to form the new "University of the State of Florida", a school for men in Gainesville, while the campus of Florida State College in Tallahassee was transformed into a school for women. Construction began immediately on a new campus in Gainesville, but it would not be ready until the fall of 1906, so classes were offered at the existing Lake City campus during the 1905–06 academic year. 

The hybrid University of Florida in Lake City attempted to field a football team in the fall of 1905 but was unsuccessful. Five contests against small colleges in Florida and Georgia were scheduled, but four were cancelled because too many players were deemed to be "behind in their studies" by university president Andrew Sledd, who sought to increase the academic rigor of the new institution. The last game of the 1905 season against the Julian London Institute kicked off in Jacksonville but was never completed. Florida's squad refused to take the field for the second half after discovering that the opposing team included a professional player, and the game was suspended with Florida leading 6-0.

The University of the State of Florida completed its move to Gainesville for the 1906–07 academic year. When the school finally completed its first football game on October 13, 1906, their coach was former FSC head coach Jack Forsythe, and no player who had played a game for the Lake City Blue and White was on the roster.

References

University of Florida
College football winless seasons
Florida Agricultural College football seasons
University of Florida Blue and White football